The Bukhansanseong ("fortress of the mountains north of the Han") is a fortress located in Gyeonggi-do and Seoul, South Korea, dating back to the middle Joseon period. The present fort was completed in 1711, though plans for the structure date back to 1659. The name is also given to a fortress mentioned in the Samguk Sagi, constructed by Gaeru of Baekje in 132 CE, and the two are often conflated although the putative connection is contested.

The modern Bukhansanseong was built to protect the approach to Seoul, filling a gap in Korea's defences that had become apparent during the second Manchu invasion of 1636 and the earlier Imjin War. The Bukhansanseong was used as a royal retreat in emergencies, and contains 120 rooms.

History

Three Kingdoms of Korea Era
It was first built in 132 CE by Gaeru of kingdom of Baekje. During Baekje era, this fortress was used for the defense of the capital when Baekje set up its capital at Wiryeseong Fortress in Hanam.

Joseon Era
The current Bukhansanseong Fortress was built in 1711 CE by King Sukjong of Joseon. After the Japanese invasions of Korea (1592–98) and Second Manchu invasion of Korea(1636), fierce discussion broke out in the royal court about constructing fortress that can protect the kingdom against external threats. Although discussion about building new fortress began in 1451 CE during the era of king Munjong of Joseon, Actual construction of the Bukhansanseong Fortress began on 3 April, in 1711 during 37th year of King Sukjong of Joseon. The construction of Bukhansanseong Fortress was relatively faster than discussion and planning period. 12.7 km of Fortress outer wall was built just in 6-month time (October in 1711). Haeng-gung (Temporary Palace), was built in May 1712, and Jong-seong-mun,, which was built to protect inner fortress and essential facilities, such as Haeng-gung or jung-heung-sa, was finished in 1714.

Structure

Total length of Bukhansanseong Fortress is 12.7 km and total area of the Fortress is 6.2 km2. There were 6 great gates, 8 secret gates, 2 water gates, and 143 seong-rang (sentry post)

Bukhansanseong Fortress also has one Temporary Palace, three Jang-dae (Commanding Post), three Yu-young (Military Camp)for defensive purpose. Three different units were stationed in Bukhansanseong Fortress, called Sam-gun-mun (Hun-ryeong-do-gam, Geum-wei-young, and Eo-young-cheong). They were stationed in three different location within Bukhansanseong Fortress, and the main responsibility of those units was the protection of the Bukhansanseong Fortress.

13 Buddhist temples were also established within the wall of Bukhansanseong Fortress for Buddhist monks soldiers. Only 6 Buddhist temples remain today, but all lost temples are designated as historical site.

In addition, 7 Armories, 99 wells, and 22 small reservoirs were under the control of Bukhansanseong Fortress.

See also 
 Namhansanseong
 History of Korea
 Castles in Korea
 Hwaseong Fortress

References

Forts in South Korea
Tourist attractions in Gyeonggi Province
Tourist attractions in Seoul
Buildings and structures in Seoul
Historic Sites of South Korea